Jarvis R. Bishop (March 22, 1938 – June 21, 2022) was an American football coach.  He served as the head football coach at Wheaton College in Wheaton, Illinois for 14 seasons, from 1982 to 1995, compiling a record of 84–43–1.

References

1938 births
2022 deaths
Franklin Grizzlies football players
Wheaton Thunder football coaches
People from Oakland City, Indiana
People from Princeton, Indiana
Players of American football from Indiana